Richard Sandoval (born 18 October 1960) is an American retired professional boxer and former Lineal and WBA Bantamweight Champion. Sandoval was a silver medalist at the 1979 Pan American Games in Puerto Rico and was a U.S. Olympian during his amateur career. He's also the younger brother of title contender Alberto Sandoval.

Early life
Sandoval who is of Mexican descent was born in Pomona, California, a city famous in pugilistic circles as a hot-bed for young boxing prospects, including Shane Mosley.

Sandoval's brother Alberto Sandoval was a popular bantamweight of the 1970s, who unsuccessfully challenged Carlos Zarate and Lupe Pintor for the world title.

The young Sandoval met another future world champion, Alberto Davila, at Pomona boxing gyms. Eventually, they became friends, and they shared the burden of boxing's dangers later on in life.

Amateur career
He was a two-time National Golden Gloves Champion and from 1979–1980, Sandoval went on to win the National AAU Championship at Light Flyweight and then in the Flyweight division. Sanadoval qualified for the 1980 U.S. Olympic team but was unable to compete due to the 1980 Summer Olympics boycott. In 2007, he received one of 461 Congressional Gold Medals created especially for the spurned athletes.

Professional career
Richie Sandoval made his professional boxing debut on 5 November 1980, beating Gerardo Pedroza in Las Vegas, Nevada by a knockout in two rounds. He won his first ten fights by knockout, including two over fringe contender Javier Barajas. For his eleventh fight, Sandoval met Harold Petty, a boxer still fighting professionally at the age of 42 who challenged twice for world titles. On 28 January 1982, he outpointed the undefeated Petty over ten rounds, going on to seven more wins that year, including another ten-round points victory over Petty.

Sandoval had five wins in 1983, the year in which his friend Davila won the WBC Bantamweight title by knocking out Kiko Bejines, who died days later. This introduced Sandoval to the darker side of boxing as he saw how hard it was for Davila to recover.

WBA Bantamweight Championship
Sandoval's next fight was held on 15 March 1984. Despite his record of 22 victories without any losses, including fifteen knockouts, he was a virtual unknown to most boxing fans when he met the Lineal and WBA Bantamweight champion Jeff Chandler in Atlantic City. After dropping the champion in round eleven, Sandoval won by TKO in round fifteen to become a world champion in a major upset. He followed this up with his first trip abroad as a professional boxer, to Monte Carlo on September 22.  He outpointed the top ranked and well known Edgar Román over fifteen rounds on the undercard of Donald Curry's sixth-round knockout win over Nino LaRocca.  He fought again on 15 December against Cardenio Ulloa, who was attempting to become the first Chilean world boxing champion in history. According to the report made by Ring En Español, Ulloa caused Chilean dictator Augusto Pinochet to jump off his chair with excitement when he dropped Sandoval in the third round, but Sandoval recovered and retained the title with an eighth-round knockout.

By then, however, Sandoval was facing weight problems and he could barely make the weight even for fights in the Featherweight division, two divisions above Bantamweight, and he was forced to fight all his fights in 1985 as a Featherweight instead. He scored three ten-round decisions that year and one in 1986, including wins over Frankie Duarte and Diego Avila.

Last bout and title defence
After not defending his title for a year and a half, he was forced by the WBA to defend his title or be stripped of it. He chose to defend it, despite his problems making the weight. On 3 March 1986, Sandoval defended his title against Gaby Canizales, as part of a super-undercard organized by promoter Bob Arum, which included the Hearns versus Shuler and Hagler versus Mugabi encounters. Sandoval reportedly had to lose around twelve pounds in three days in order to be able to fight that night, staying off any solid foods and surviving only on water. Weakened and feeling the side-effects of such a sudden drop-off in weight, Sandoval suffered four knockdowns, but he fought on until the fifth knockdown, which happened in round seven, after which the referee stopped the fight.  He fell unconscious a few minutes after the fight, stopping breathing for an estimated three minutes. He was rushed to hospital by local on-site paramedics, but he remained in critical condition for the next few nights. He had life-saving brain surgery, but the inevitable consequence was that Sandoval was obliged to retire. His final record was 29 wins and one loss, 17 wins by knockout.

Retirement
Sandoval later went touring across the United States with Davila, as each had been through both sides of a tragic boxing bout. They went on television talk-shows and public appearances to explain to the general public how a boxer feels (in Davila's case) after an opponent has died, and how a boxer can be so close to death in an instant after a fight (in Sandoval's case), and then having to deal with the fact that he or she will never be able to box again. Sandoval and Davila remain friends.

See also
List of Mexican boxing world champions
Notable boxing families
List of WBA world champions
List of Bantamweight world champions

References

External links

Richie Sandoval - CBZ Profile

1960 births
Living people
Boxers from California
American boxers of Mexican descent
Sportspeople from Pomona, California
Bantamweight boxers
World boxing champions
World bantamweight boxing champions
World Boxing Association champions
Winners of the United States Championship for amateur boxers
American male boxers
AIBA World Boxing Championships medalists
Boxers at the 1979 Pan American Games
Pan American Games silver medalists for the United States
Pan American Games medalists in boxing
Congressional Gold Medal recipients
Medalists at the 1979 Pan American Games